Capreol is a community in the Ontario city of Greater Sudbury.  Situated on the Vermilion River (35 mins north of the downtown core), Capreol is the city's northernmost populated area.

From 1918 to 2000, Capreol existed as an independent town. However, on January 1, 2001, the towns and cities of the Regional Municipality of Sudbury were amalgamated into the single-tier city of Greater Sudbury.

History

Early settlement, development and expansion
Capreol formed around the Capreol railway station, which was a major divisional point on the Canadian National Railway line. Its name comes from Frederick Chase Capreol, the original promoter of the Northern Railway of Canada.  It was founded in 1911 and incorporated as a town in 1918. The first family to move into Capreol was Adolph and Margaret Sawyer, both of whom pioneered in farming.

Although the town was originally an independent community with its own thriving economy, it gradually became a satellite community to the more rapidly growing city of Sudbury, approximately 40 kilometres to the south. In 1916, there were thirty families in town, and by 1919, sixty houses had been built. It was then decided that Capreol would build its own YMCA. In 1920, the construction of the YMCA was in progress, but was damaged by fire, to the extent of $40,000. The YMCA was rebuilt at double the cost and finally opened in 1921.

In 1973, the boundaries of the town of Capreol were expanded to include the nearby villages of Sellwood and Milnet, and the town was incorporated into the Regional Municipality of Sudbury. However, despite its status as part of the regional municipality, during this era Statistics Canada did not include the town in Sudbury's Census Metropolitan Area.

Amalgamation
On January 1, 2001, Capreol and the other cities and towns of the regional municipality were amalgamated into the city of Greater Sudbury. In the Canada 2011 Census, Capreol was listed for the first time as one of six distinct population centres (or urban areas) within the city, with a population of 3,276 and a population density of 537.7 km2; however, the boundaries of this statistical aggregation correspond only to the main townsite of Capreol, and not to the full municipal boundaries as they existed prior to 2001. The community is part of Ward 7 on Greater Sudbury City Council, and is represented by councillor Mike Jakubo.

Sports and culture

Capreol is the location of the Northern Ontario Railroad Museum, a heritage attraction located in the former CN and CNoR superintendent's home and Prescott Park, taking up a large portion of the town's downtown core parallel to the railroad tracks.

From 1978 to 1986, Capreol had a Northern Ontario Junior Hockey League team called the Capreol Hawks, who won the league title in 1980-81.

Transportation

Capreol has a long history as a Northern Ontario railway town and is today still situated along the Canadian National Railway mainline. It is served by the Canadian, Canada's transcontinental passenger rail service, which is operated by Via Rail and which stops at Capreol station. Capreol station marks the Canadian's last north- and west-bound stop in Greater Sudbury before continuing its journey toward Northwestern Ontario and, ultimately, British Columbia.

Local bus service is available in Capreol via Greater Sudbury Transit's 105 Valley Route, which connects with downtown Sudbury and the Sudbury Transit Centre.

Ghost towns

The former villages of Milnet and Sellwood, located within the area annexed by Capreol in 1973, are both now ghost towns.

Milnet (originally named Sellwood Junction up to 1916) began as a stop along the Canadian Northern Railway. In 1917, after the railway was laid down, the Marshay Lumber Company built a mill and began a 22-year process of cutting trees from the area. Men from logging camps upstream would let the Vermilion River carry the logs to the mill in Milnet. From there the men at the mill would cut the wood on the blade and then move it along to the planar mill.

An open pit mine now stands where the Sellwood townsite once was.

Former mayors
 P. Kilgour - 1927-1928
 B. M. Robinson - 1931
 Willam Gibson - 1932-1935
 James E. Coyne - 1936-1943
 Willam Gibson - 1944-1946
 Alistair MacLean - 1947-1952
 William Gibson - 1953-1954 
 Harold Prescott - 1955-1969
 Norman Fawcett - 1969-1973
 Harold Prescott - 1973-1975
 Frank Mazzuca - 1975-1997
 Dave Kilgour - 1997-2000

Notable residents 
 Jean Robert Beaulé, politician
 Fred Boimistruck, NHL hockey player
 Joffre Desilets, NHL hockey player
 Norman Fawcett, politician
 Pete Horeck, NHL hockey player
 Elie Martel, politician
 Rob MacDonald, mixed martial artist
 Shelley Martel, politician
 Frank Mazzuca Sr., politician
 Mike Miron, lacrosse player
 Doug Mohns, NHL hockey player
 Allan Patterson, politician
 Donald Bartlett Reid, politician
 Barbara Tyson, actress

Images

See also

 List of unincorporated communities in Ontario

References

External links
Capreol Online
Capreol's Information Pages
Abandoned Milnet
History of Capreol at Greater Sudbury Heritage Museums

Neighbourhoods in Greater Sudbury
Populated places established in 1918
Populated places disestablished in 2000
Former towns in Ontario
Railway towns in Ontario